As of November 2022, minefields in Croatia cover  of territory. The minefields (usually known as "mine suspected areas" or MSA) are located in 6 counties and 29 cities and municipalities. These areas are thought to contain approximately c.13,588 land mines, in addition to unexploded ordnance left over from the Croatian War of Independence.

The area suspected of containing land mines is marked using more than 8,022 warning signs. Based on the analysis of the area structure in MSAs, at the end of 2020, after the demining, technical survey and general and supplementary general survey, it was determined that 98.7% of MSAs are forests and forest areas, while 1.1% MSAs of the Republic of Croatia are agricultural land, and 0.2% of MSAs are categorized as "other areas" (water, wetlands, rocks, landslides, rocks, shores, etc.).

References

External links
MIS Portal – maps of mine suspected areas in Croatia

Croatia
Croatian War of Independence